Wut Wut is the second studio album by American DJ and electronic music producer Dillon Francis, released on September 28, 2018 through IDGAFOS. The album contains Spanish-language songs and collaborations with Latin singers. It was made available to pre-order and pre-save on July 11, 2018, via Francis official website. Latin and reggaeton artists featured include Residente, De La Ghetto, Jarina De Marco, Arcángel, Químico Ultra Mega and Young Ash.

Background 
On April 5, 2017, Francis launched his new label IDGAFOS with the release of the song "Say Less" featuring G-Eazy. On December 20, 2017, Francis revealed that he was working on two new albums set to be released in 2018; he first announced a Spanish-language album but without confirming a release date.

On July 11, 2018, Francis confirmed that the album would be released on September 28, 2018. He also revealed the album cover and the title on his Twitter.

Singles 
"Ven" was released as the album's lead single on January 24, 2018, featuring reggaeton singers Arcángel and Quimico Ultra Mega. The music video was released in YouTube on March 22.

"We the Funk" featuring reggaeton singer Fuego was released as the album's second single on February 21, 2018. The song peaked at number 26 on the US Billboard Dance/Electronic Songs chart. The music video was released on the same day that the song was released.
 
"Sexo" was released on April 13, 2018, as the third single from the album, in collaboration with Puerto Rican rapper Residente and featuring iLe.

"BaBaBa" featuring female rapper Young Ash was released on May 9, 2018, as the album's fourth single. The song debuted at number 47 on the Billboard Dance/Electronic Songs chart.

"Look at That Butt" featuring Jarina De Marco was released on June 20, 2018, as the album's fifth single.

Francis released the sixth single "Never Let You Go" featuring De La Ghetto on July 9, 2018, the same day he confirmed the album's release date.

On September 9, 2018, Francis announced on his Twitter that he would release a new single. A day later, Francis released the seventh single, "White Boi". He also released the music video on the same day.

A day after the album's release Francis released the album's eighth single "No Pare" featuring Yashua, and the next day he released "Cuando" featuring Happy Colors.

Track listing

Charts

References

2018 albums
Spanish-language albums
Albums produced by Dillon Francis
Dillon Francis albums